Iskino (İskin) is a rural locality (a village) in Ufa, Bashkortostan, Russia. The population was 567 as of 2010. There are 13 streets.

Geography 
Iskino is located 26 km south of Ufa. Polyana is the nearest rural locality.

References 

Rural localities in Ufa urban okrug